Steven Cabas (born August 2, 1989 in Miami, Florida) is an American soccer player who played for Miami FC in the USSF Division 2 Professional League.

Career

Youth and college
Cabas attended Miami Coral Park High School, where he was a first-team all-county performer, was named Rookie of the Year as a high school freshman, Most Consistent as a sophomore and second-team All-Dade County as a junior. He played club soccer for the Kendall Soccer Coalition from 1998–2007, was a member of his region's Olympic Development Team for four years, and was part of several championship teams, winning the 2004 Lake Garda Cup in Italy and the 2005 Mexicana Cup.

He played three years of college soccer for Florida International University, where he was a Conference USA All-Tournament selection as a sophomore in 2008.

Professional
Cabas left college one season early, and turned professional in 2010 when he signed with Miami FC of the USSF Division 2 Professional League. He made his professional debut on April 10, 2010 in a game against the Rochester Rhinos.

International
Cabas was a member of the United States U-20 men's national soccer team in 2007.

References

External links 
 US Soccer player profile
 FIU player profile

1989 births
Living people
American soccer players
FIU Panthers men's soccer players
Miami FC (2006) players
USSF Division 2 Professional League players
United States men's under-20 international soccer players
Association football forwards